Ernesto Nogueira do Oliveira (28 July 1921 – 24 February 2016) was a Portuguese footballer who played as a goalkeeper.

Football career 

Ernesto Oliveira gained 6 caps for Portugal and made his debut 14 May 1950 in Lisbon against England, in a 3-5 defeat.

References

External links 
 
 

1921 births
2016 deaths
Portuguese footballers
Association football goalkeepers
Primeira Liga players
Portugal international footballers
Footballers from Lisbon